Nothing but Thieves are an English rock band, formed in 2012 in Southend-on-Sea, Essex. They consist of lead vocalist and guitarist Conor Mason, guitarist Joe Langridge-Brown, guitarist and keyboardist Dominic Craik, bassist Philip Blake, and drummer James Price. In 2014, they signed to RCA Records and a year later in October 2015, they released their self-titled debut album. Their second album, Broken Machine was released in September 2017, receiving wide acclaim in addition to peaking at No. 2 in the UK Album Charts. They released an EP entitled What Did You Think When You Made Me This Way? in October 2018, followed by their third studio album, Moral Panic, in October 2020, which peaked at No. 3 in the UK Album Charts.

Their style of music has been compared to the likes of Foals, Civil Twilight, and Royal Blood.

Background

2012–2016: Formation and debut album 

The band's single "Itch" picked up Hottest Record and Track Of The Day accolades on Radio 1 and also made it onto the Radio 1 playlist, as well as being added in regular rotation of Sirius XM new hard-rock channel Octane. The band were picked by Gerard Way and thereafter Awolnation to support European dates. They supported Arcade Fire and George Ezra at the BRITs show for War Child at the Electric in Brixton, performed at the NME Awards show, and toured with Twin Atlantic, Darlia, and Young Guns on separate support tours across the country. They have also been added to a multitude of European festivals including Reading & Leeds and Isle of Wight Festival. In November 2014 they supported Twenty One Pilots alongside Purple at London's Electric Brixton. In July 2015 they supported Muse at the Rock In Roma show, playing in front of 30,000 people.

Nothing but Thieves, their debut studio album, was released on 16 October 2015 in the UK through Sony Music Entertainment, and on 5 February 2016 in the US through RCA Victor.
It was produced by Julian Emery, with additional production by Jim Irvin, Dominic Craik and Larry Hibbitt, and mixes by Cenzo Townshend and Adam Noble. It entered the Official UK Albums Chart at No. 7, peaked at No. 3 on iTunes, and was No.1 on the vinyl album charts.

Their sold-out "Ban All the Music" tour of the UK began on 19 October 2015. A second British tour in April 2016, called the "Under My Skin" tour, was announced on 9 November 2015. The band had to postpone some dates on their "Under My Skin" tour as they were asked to support Muse on their "Drones" tour. They tweeted their elation on Twitter, branding the experience "pretty awesome".

In June 2016 they announced further tour dates in November and December 2016 in Birmingham, Manchester and London climaxing at the 5,000 capacity Brixton Academy. As of May 4, 2017, the album has sold over 250,000 copies, and accumulated 174 million track streams.

2016–2020: Broken Machine and What Did You Think When You Made Me This Way? 

A small tour of UK clubs took place in late May 2017, to support "Amsterdam," the first single from their second album Broken Machine, released on 8 September 2017. Later on 14 August, the second single, "Sorry", became their first single to chart on the UK Singles Chart, reaching No.89. On 5 August 2017 they played to a crowd of over 500,000 people at Woodstock Festival Poland. On 23 August 2017 they supported Muse and Biffy Clyro at Vital Festival in Belfast ahead of their sold out "Broken Machine" tour. The band also sold out two consecutive nights at the Roundhouse in London.

Sarah Taylor said on Varsity "In general, this album pushes more boundaries than the last one. The band carved a name for themselves with their debut, but here it feels like they’re trying to define themselves to a further extent; there’s more variety in the music and lyricism, and more politics, too. Joe Langridge-Brown, guitarist and lyricist alongside Mason, said that “all the songs on the album are things that we’ve gone through or spoken about: Trump, religion, bigotry...” and ‘Live Like Animals’ is an anthem for the disillusioned youth. It features lyrics such as “We put our lives all up for sale / We get our truth in the daily mail” and “We’re gonna make ’em build a wall / We’re gonna live like animals”. Other tracks, such as ‘Broken Machine’ itself, and the deluxe version's ‘Number 13’ are more experimental rhythmically: they're the type of songs you have to listen to a few times before you decide whether you like them or not. I did, and I do.".

On 24 August 2018, the band debuted a new song live entitled "Forever and Ever More" at Reading Festival, which was released as the lead off single from their new EP, "What Did You Think When You Made Me This Way?" a few days later. The EP was released on 19 October 2018 alongside the second single "Take This Lonely Heart", on the same day.

2020–2023: Moral Panic and Moral Panic II 

On 18 March 2020, the first single of their third studio album was released, named "Is Everybody Going Crazy?". On 23 June 2020, the band announced that their third album, titled Moral Panic would be released on 23 October 2020, alongside the release of the second single from the album, "Real Love Song", on the same day.  Three more singles followed; "Unperson", "Impossible" and "Phobia". On 14 September 2020, dates for a UK and Ireland arena tour were announced, beginning in September 2021. The album was released on 23 October 2020, receiving generally favourable reviews. It reached No. 3 on the UK Albums Chart.

Despite not being able to play gigs, a new single, called "Futureproof" was released on 8 June 2021. It was the first single off a new EP, titled Moral Panic II, which was announced on 9 July 2021 and released on 23 July, along with second single "Miracle, Baby”. Speaking of the EP, the band said they "didn’t feel like we were done with the Moral Panic theme", and the release aims to "explore some avenues we felt the album may have missed".

The band undertook a tour of the UK in October 2021, including a headline show at the London O2 Arena on October 8, 2021.

2023–present: Dead Club City
On 15 March 2023, the band released a new single, "Welcome to the DCC", alongside announcing their upcoming fourth album, titled Dead Club City, for release on 7 July 2023.

Members
Conor Mason – lead vocals, guitars
Joe Langridge-Brown – guitars, backing vocals
Dominic Craik – guitars, keyboard, piano, backing vocals
Philip Blake – bass guitar
James Price – drums, drum machine

Discography

Studio albums

Extended plays

Singles

Other charted songs

Notes

Music videos

Other appearances

References

External links

2012 establishments in England
Musical groups established in 2012
English alternative rock groups
Musical quintets
Music in Southend-on-Sea
Musical groups from Essex